Cyril Stanley Mann (31 August 1918 – 3 March 1964) was an Australian rules footballer who played with Carlton in the Victorian Football League (VFL). He was a full forward and noted for his high marking.

Notes

External links 

Cyril Mann's profile at Blueseum

1918 births
1964 deaths
Carlton Football Club players
Port Melbourne Football Club players
Brunswick Football Club players
Australian rules footballers from Victoria (Australia)
Indigenous Australian players of Australian rules football
Australian Army personnel of World War II
Australian Army soldiers